Aud Folkestad (born 10 February 1953) is a Norwegian politician for the Liberal Party.

She was a deputy representative to the Norwegian Parliament from Møre og Romsdal during the term 1997–2001. In total she met during 8 days of parliamentary session.

See also
Politics of Norway

References

1953 births
Living people
Liberal Party (Norway) politicians
Deputy members of the Storting
Women members of the Storting
Place of birth missing (living people)
21st-century Norwegian women politicians